Bani Abdullah is a sub-district located in Al Udayn District, Ibb Governorate, Yemen. Bani Abdullah had a population of 5021 as of 2004.

References 

Sub-districts in Al Udayn District